The 7.7 cm Feldkanone 96 (7.7 cm FK 96) was a field gun used by Germany before World War I.

History
It was a thoroughly conventional gun, being a modernized version of Krupp's FK 73 gun, but failed to incorporate any recoil system other than a partially effective spade brake, and fired a 12-pound projectile. Thus it was rendered obsolete when the French introduced their Canon de 75 modèle 1897 the following year. Most guns were rebuilt to modern standards (only the barrel was retained) in 1904 as the 7.7 cm FK 96 n.A. (neuer Art) [new model] which served throughout World War I as one of Germany's main light field guns. The remaining unmodified guns were then known as the 7.7 cm FK 96 a.A. (alte Art or old model).

A number of 7.5 cm Krupp L/24 quick firing guns, similar to the 7.7 cm Feldkanone C/96 (FK 96 a/A) guns, were sold to the Boer republic of Transvaal.  These guns were used with good effect against the British in the Second Boer War between 1899 and 1902. A number of 7.7 cm FK 96 a/A guns were also used by German Colonial (Schutztruppen) batteries during the 1904 Herero Wars and during the South African invasion of German South West Africa, 1914–1915.

See also
C64 (field gun), roughly its predecessor in the Franco-Prussian and Second Schleswig War.
7.7 cm FK 96 n.A. : modernised version

Weapons of comparable role, performance and era
Ordnance BL 15 pounder, British equivalent

References

 Jäger, Herbert. German Artillery of World War One. Ramsbury, Marlborough, Wiltshire: Crowood Press, 2001 
 Ortner, M. Christian. The Austro-Hungarian Artillery From 1867 to 1918: Technology, Organization, and Tactics. Vienna, Verlag Militaria, 2007

External links
7.7 cm FK 96 on Landships
 Fotos from the Muswellbrook RSL, Muswellbrook, NSW 

World War I artillery of Germany
World War I guns
77 mm artillery